Truly Nolen is a family-owned pest control company with  franchises most commonly associated with the yellow mouse car. It has 95 locations in the United States and 200 plus franchises in 61 countries.

History
The company was founded in 1938, by Truly Wheatfield Nolen in Miami, Florida, as part of a home improvement business. Truly Nolen America is owned and managed by the Nolen family Generation.

Structure
The company integrated the business originally owned by the current executive officer, Truly David Nolen, in Tucson, Arizona and the business of his father, Truly Wheatfield Nolen, owned prior to his death in 1966 in South Miami Beach, Florida.  There are about 70 branches in seven states. The company operates in a decentralized manner with administrative units in separate cities.

The company offers franchises.

Training Centers

The company maintains two training centers run by full-time staff in Florida and Arizona. 

Training is conducted both in the classroom and in the field to ensure the employees are trained to the legal standard in the state they are employed.  Initial training for all employees is targeted at passing the state's licensing or certification examination along with basic customer service and treatment techniques.

Branch types

Commercial pest control
Specialized Commercial branches focus on industrial and commercial properties and offer advisement services in addition to treatment options.

Termite
Termite branches employ specialized training in termite and wood destroying organism control techniques and may include fumigators in some areas.  Termite pretreatment is also performed through these branches.  Truly Nolen can employ additional techniques to mitigate damage or appearance degradation from conventional treatment techniques.

Residential pest control
Residential pest control technicians are the most commonly seen members of the company equipped for handling most home pests. Many technicianshave several years with the company and a small number have been with the company for 15 or more years.

Franchise
Franchise branches have become increasingly important to Truly Nolen's growth strategy and differ from corporate branches in that they're independently owned and operated by local partners. As of 2018, there are approximately 30 franchise branches throughout North America. Services vary from one franchise branch to the next depending on the local needs and pest pressure of the respective geography.

Public relations

Truly Nolen is the owner of a fleet of antique vehicles often displayed in front of their branches.  The company maintains a specialist shop that restores these vehicles in addition to performing the modifications to working vehicles.

Mouse car ears are hinged to help with gas mileage.

Truck "antennae" are made of toilet floats and air conditioning tubing.

References

External links
trulynolen website

American companies established in 1938
Chemical companies established in 1938
Business services companies established in 1938
Pest control companies of the United States
Companies based in Tucson, Arizona